George Augustus Marden (August 9, 1839 – December 19, 1906) was an American journalist, attorney and politician who served as Massachusetts Treasurer and as assistant treasurer of the United States for the Boston subtreasury.

Biography
George A. Marden was born in Mount Vernon, New Hampshire on August 9, 1839. He attended Appleton Academy, and graduated from Dartmouth College in 1861.

He worked for the Concord Monitor, and The Boston Advertiser.  Marston also was the editor and part owner of the Lowell Courier.

He was sworn in as assistant treasurer of the United States for the Boston subtreasury on April 1, 1899.

He died at his home in Lowell, Massachusetts on December 19, 1906.

See also
 1873 Massachusetts legislature
 1883 Massachusetts legislature

References

 

1839 births
1906 deaths
People from Mont Vernon, New Hampshire
People of New Hampshire in the American Civil War
Boston Daily Advertiser people
Republican Party members of the Massachusetts House of Representatives
State treasurers of Massachusetts
Speakers of the Massachusetts House of Representatives
American male journalists
Concord Monitor people
Union Army personnel
Dartmouth College alumni
19th-century American politicians